John Edgar Ainsworth (June 28, 1920 – September 30, 2004) was a physicist and polymath who worked for NASA. Ainsworth was the primary designer of the Pioneer Venus probe.

References

1920 births
2004 deaths
20th-century American physicists
NASA people
University of Maryland, College Park alumni
Harvard College alumni
St. John's College (Annapolis/Santa Fe) alumni